The Negro's Complaint is a poem by William Cowper, which talks about slavery from the perspective of the slave. It was written in 1788. It was intended to be sung to the tune of a popular ballad, Admiral Hosier's Ghost.

Text

References

External links

  (multiple versions)

1788 poems
Poetry by William Cowper
Works about slavery